Bostan, Bustan, Boustan or Boostan may refer to:

Places

Iran
 Shahrak-e Bostan, Fars Province
 Bostan, Kerman, Kerman Province
 Bostan, Iran, Khuzestan Province
 Bostan District (Dasht-e Azadegan County), Khuzestan province
 Bostan Rural District (Khuzestan Province)
 Bustan, Kohgiluyeh and Boyer-Ahmad
 Bustan-e Kuchek, Kohgiluyeh and Boyer-Ahmad Province
 Bostan Rural District (Razavi Khorasan Province)
 Boustan Street, Tehran, renamed Nimr Baqir al-Nimr Street in 2016
 Bostan District (Baharestan County), Tehran province

Kyrgyzstan
 Boston, Nooken, Nooken District, Jalal-Abad Region
 Boston, Suzak, Suzak District, Jalal-Abad Region
 Boston, Osh, Özgön District, Osh Region

Oman
 Al-Bustan, Oman, Muscat, eastern Oman

Pakistan
 Bostan, Pishin, Balochistan
 Bostan, Sibi, Balochistan

Palestine / Israel
Al Bustan, Arabic term for King's Garden, Jerusalem

Saudi Arabia
Al Bustan, Saudi Arabia, village in Al Madinah Province, western Saudi Arabia

Syria
 Al-Bustan, Syria, a village in the Masyaf Subdistrict in Masyaf District, west of Hama, Syria
 Bustan al-Basha, a village in Latakia Governorate, along the Mediterranean coastline, northern Syria

Uzbekistan
 Bo‘ston, Karakalpakstan
 Bo‘ston, Jizzakh Region
Greece

 Bostani (Μποστάνι)

People
 Bostan Karim (also Bostan Qaseem, born c. 1970), a citizen of Afghanistan
 Elisabeta Bostan (born 1931), Romanian film director 
 Ion Bostan (film director) (1914–1992), Romanian film director
 Ion Bostan (academic) (born 1949), Moldovan researcher

Other
 Boostan, a Persian carpet masterwork
 Boustan, a Lebanese-Canadian fast food restaurant chain in Montreal, Quebec
 Bustan (book), by the Persian poet Saadi
Būstān al-jāmiʿ, an anonymous medieval Arabic chronicle
 Bustan (organization), a joint Israeli–Palestinian non-governmental organization
 Bustan Birke, an archaeological site in Lebanon
 Taq Bostan, a series of rock reliefs in Iran

See also 
 Al Bustan (disambiguation)
 Bostan Rural District (disambiguation)
 Bostanabad (disambiguation)
 Boston (disambiguation)
 Basatin (disambiguation), the plural form of bostan
 Boustani, a family of Lebanese origin
 Lashkargah, Afghanistan, historically known as Bost

Romanian-language surnames